Angonyx is a genus of moths in the family Sphingidae erected by Jean Baptiste Boisduval in 1875.

Species
Angonyx boisduvali Rothschild 1894
Angonyx chelsea Eitschberger & Melichar, 2009
Angonyx excellens (Rothschild 1911)
Angonyx kai Eitschberger, 2006
Angonyx krishna Eitschberger & Haxaire, 2006
Angonyx meeki Rothschild & Jordan 1903
Angonyx papuana Rothschild & Jordan 1903
Angonyx testacea (Walker 1856)
Angonyx williami Eitschberger & Melichar, 2009

References

 
Macroglossini
Moth genera
Taxa named by Jean Baptiste Boisduval